Mickey's PhilharMagic is a 4D film attraction found at several Disney theme parks around the world, including Magic Kingdom theme park at the Walt Disney World Resort, Hong Kong Disneyland, Tokyo Disneyland, Disneyland Park (Paris), and Disney California Adventure. The film was directed by George Scribner, who also directed Disney's 1988 animated film Oliver & Company. Mickey's PhilharMagic is a 12-minute-long show featuring 3D effects, scents, and water, as well as a number of characters from Disney movies. It is shown on the largest purpose-built 3D screen ever made, at 150 feet wide.

The versions of the film at Disney California Adventure and Disneyland Paris were updated in 2021 with an additional scene based on Pixar's Coco, with the Magic Kingdom receiving the same update in fall 2021, as a part of the World's Most Magical Celebration, and in Tokyo Disneyland receiving the same update in fall 2022.

Voice cast
 Wayne Allwine as Mickey Mouse
 Clarence Nash as Donald Duck (archival recordings)
 Tony Anselmo as Donald Duck (five lines)
 Russi Taylor as Minnie Mouse
 Bill Farmer as Goofy
 Jerry Orbach as Lumiere
 Jodi Benson as Ariel
 Jason Weaver as Simba
 Rowan Atkinson as Zazu
 Anthony Gonzalez as Miguel Rivera
 Gael García Bernal as Hector
 Blayne Weaver as Peter Pan
 Brad Kane as Aladdin
 Lea Salonga as Jasmine
 Gilbert Gottfried as Iago

Locations 
At Walt Disney World's Magic Kingdom, Mickey's PhilharMagic is located adjacent to Peter Pan's Flight and the Fantasy Faire shop in Fantasyland. This is the fourth attraction to utilize this show building. The theatre originally hosted the Mickey Mouse Revue. Later, it was the home to the 3-D film Magic Journeys, after it left Epcot's Journey into Imagination pavilion to make way for Captain EO. Most recently, it was home to the stage presentation Legend of The Lion King.

At Hong Kong Disneyland, Mickey's PhilharMagic takes place of the Fantasyland Concert Hall, which is located adjacent to Royal Banquet Hall in Fantasyland.

At Tokyo Disneyland, it takes the place of the Mickey Mouse Revue, which was originally located at Walt Disney World before moving to Tokyo Disneyland as one of its original attractions.

At Disneyland Paris, it takes the place of Discoveryland Theatre, taking over from previous attractions like the Disney & Pixar Short Film Festival, Honey, I Shrunk the Audience! and Captain EO.

At Disney California Adventure, it takes place at Sunset Showcase Theater in Hollywood Land, taking over from previous attractions like the For the First Time in Forever: A Frozen Sing-Along Celebration and Muppet*Vision 3D.

Songs 
 "Be Our Guest" from Beauty and the Beast
 "The Sorcerer's Apprentice" from Fantasia 
 "Part of Your World" from The Little Mermaid
 "I Just Can't Wait to Be King" from The Lion King 
 "Un Poco Loco" from Coco (California, Paris, Florida and Tokyo only)
 "You Can Fly!" from Peter Pan 
 "A Whole New World" from Aladdin
 "Mickey Mouse March" from The Mickey Mouse Club

Development 
The attraction is unique in being one of a very select number of attractions in the Disney theme parks in which Walt Disney Imagineering has collaborated with another division of The Walt Disney Company – in this instance, it was Walt Disney Animation Studios. This same partnership developed the Fantasmic! shows at Disneyland and Disney's Hollywood Studios. Between the two companies, some of Disney's top talent worked together. Including Disney veteran Alex Mann, who was instrumental in developing and scripting the final story. Legendary Disney animator Glen Keane re-animated Ariel from The Little Mermaid in 3D, returning after animating her in 2D in the original film. Nik Ranieri, supervising animator of Lumière in Beauty and the Beast, also returned to animate that character in 3D. Most of Donald Duck's dialogue is actually archival recordings by his original voice actor, Clarence Nash. Tony Anselmo, Donald's current voice actor, recorded only five new lines for the character in this attraction (such as the scene where Donald hums to the tune of the song "Be Our Guest" from Disney's Beauty and the Beast) and a few more for the Coco segment.

On July 1, 2021, it was announced a new scene would be added to the film featuring "Un Poco Loco" from Pixar's Coco. The new segment was added to Disney California Adventure and Disneyland Paris on July 17, 2021, and in Magic Kingdom on November 12, 2021, coinciding with Walt Disney World's The World's Most Magical Celebration, and in Tokyo Disneyland on September 15, 2022.

Plot synopsis

Outside the Queue Area 
As the theater doors open, Mickey Mouse is performing with his PhilharMagic Orchestra at the Fantasyland Concert Hall (Orlando, Hong Kong, and Tokyo), Discoveryland Theatre (Paris), and Sunset Showcase Theater (Anaheim).

Inside the Queue Area 
There are posters advertising the Concert Hall's past productions and performers, such as Hades from Hercules, Ariel from The Little Mermaid, Genie from Aladdin, Wheezy from Toy Story 2, Willie the Whale from Make Mine Music, The Three Caballeros, The Big Bad Wolf and The Three Little Pigs.

The Theater's Lobby 
Upon entering the theater's lobby, guests pick up their "opera glasses" (3D glasses). During their wait, guests hear orchestral music from Fantasia, Fantasia 2000, and other Disney animated films.

Fantasyland Concert Hall (Orlando, Hong Kong, and Tokyo)/Discoveryland Theater (Paris)/Sunset Showcase Theater (Anaheim) 
Goofy, the Concert Hall's stage manager, admits the guests into the main theater, where final preparations for the performance are underway. After accidentally disturbing a cat, Goofy lugs in an electrical cord and gets electrocuted. Minnie Mouse then tells the guests to put on their "opera glasses" after reminding them that, as a courtesy to the attraction, there should not be eating, drinking, smoking or flash photography during the show. After this instruction, Minnie then realizes that Donald Duck has gone missing and goes to tell Mickey. Goofy then raises the curtains (despite Mickey protesting that they aren't ready yet, which Goofy does not hear) to reveal that the stage is empty, except for a conductor's podium and Donald, who is sleeping in a box. Mickey races onto the stage in a hurry, quickly telling Donald to unpack the instruments. Mickey places his famous Sorcerer's hat on the podium, then dashes off the stage to get his clothes, ordering Donald, "Don't forget the orchestra. And don't touch my hat!" After Donald wakes up, he immediately unpacks all the instruments, including a grand piano, from the small box, and sets up the stage, he is then tempted to try on the Sorcerer's Hat himself. He does so, disobeying Mickey's orders, which causes the magical instruments to come to life under his command and instead play an extremely unpleasant melody when Donald conducts. Donald tells the instruments to "stop it" and the instruments stop, except for a small flute whistling the "Mickey Mouse March", who messes with him and the instruments laugh at the antics. However, when Donald bullies the flute, the other instruments, immediately shocked and angered, rise up and attack him, creating a battle storm which then turns into a whirlwind of magic and music as the "Mickey Mouse March" plays. Donald loses the hat in the chaos as the whirlwind turns into a vortex into the world of Disney animated features that sucks up everything in including Donald and he passes through songs from different Disney and Pixar animated features while trying to retrieve the hat.

After the whirlwind vortex passes, Donald finds himself in the dark, which takes us inside the dining room of the Beast’s Castle in Beauty and the Beast with Lumière, who begins to sing "Be Our Guest". Guests can smell the food, triggering hidden smell cannons in the theater, and when the champagne bottles pop, they feel a quick blast of wind in their faces surrounded by cakes, which triggers hidden air cannons in the back of the seats. The dark comes back for a few seconds when the song ends. We then find ourselves in Fantasia when the light returns from a door. The music from The Sorcerer's Apprentice plays, as the Magic Brooms enter the room from the door, splashing water on Donald and washing away the dirty dishes left behind from the previous scene and the hat. The audience also gets blasted with water. A broom smaller than Donald comes in, carrying a big bucket. Donald snatches the bucket away and laughs, but only gives it back when a gigantic broom comes in. The giant broom spills water on Donald, taking us underwater into The Little Mermaid, where Ariel is in her grotto with Flounder singing "Part of Your World". At the end of the song, an electric eel shocks Donald when he tries to kiss Ariel. Next, we fade to The Lion King, where Simba is singing "I Just Can't Wait to Be King" amidst a menagerie of African plains animals rendered in a 3D paper cut-out style. Zazu also appears in this segment. After this scene, the dust settles and we go into the Land of the Dead in Coco as the orange feathers burst out, where Miguel is singing "Un Poco Loco" alongside Héctor while skeletons dance to the music. During the concert, Dante places the hat on Donald's head, who then starts to dance with Miguel and Héctor, but Pepita then steals the hat while Donald holds onto her tail as they fly into the clouds (The newly added Coco scene has yet to be added to Hong Kong Disneyland). Then, we enter a starry night sky in London from Peter Pan, where the chorus sings "You Can Fly". Peter Pan and Tinker Bell sprinkle pixie dust on Donald, giving him the ability to fly. Finally, we go into Agrabah in Aladdin, where Aladdin and Jasmine are singing "A Whole New World" while flying through the night sky on Carpet. Donald follows them on a magic carpet of his own. He eventually retrieves the hat again by Jasmine placing it on his head. Unfortunately, the hat gets knocked off of Donald's head by Iago, and Donald jumps after it.

Donald and the hat descend back into the magical whirlwind vortex from earlier. Donald gets sucked inside, exiting the Disney animated feature world, and finding himself back on stage, still in the whirlwind. Mickey returns, puts on the hat, and uses its powers to restore order. As Mickey finally conducts the orchestra, playing a reprise of the "Mickey Mouse March", the flute that Donald bullied earlier knocks Donald into a tuba. As a fitting end, the tuba launches Donald across the theater and into its back wall. Mickey takes a bow and signs off as the curtains close. Donald's rear, appearing as an animatronic, is shown stuck in the back wall before eventually falling through the hole. This is not shown in the Paris version. Instead, extended applause is heard and Minnie thanks the guests for coming to the show.

See also 
 2011 in amusement parks

References

Citations

External links 
 
 Magic Kingdom - Mickey's PhilharMagic 
 Hong Kong Disneyland - Mickey's PhilharMagic
 Tokyo Disneyland - Mickey's PhilharMagic
 Disneyland Paris - Mickey's PhilharMagic
 Disney California Adventure - Mickey's PhilharMagic

2003 films
Walt Disney Parks and Resorts attractions
Audio-Animatronic attractions
Magic Kingdom
Hong Kong Disneyland
Tokyo Disneyland
Disneyland Park (Paris)
Disney California Adventure
2003 computer-animated films
Walt Disney Parks and Resorts films
Films about magic
Mickey Mouse films
Kodak sponsorships
Fantasyland
Tomorrowland
Hollywood Land
2005 3D films
4D films
Films directed by George Scribner
3D animated short films
2000s American animated films
2003 animated films
2003 short films
Films about mermaids
Films about musical theatre
2003 fantasy films
2000s fantasy films
Donald Duck films
Films set in concert halls
Films about music and musicians
American crossover films
Animated crossover films
Fantasy crossover films